Sardar Muhammad Raza  was Chief Election Commissioner from 6 December 2014 to 5 December 2019. who previously served as retired judge of the Supreme Court of Pakistan and as Chief Justice  of the Peshawar High Court. Khan was born in the Namli Maira village in the district of Abbottabad on 10 February 1945.

Education and training
Raza belongs to the prominent Karlal tribe in Abbottabad. After graduating from the Government College of Abbottabad, Khan received a master's degree in economics from Punjab University through the Forman Christian College University in Lahore. He received a LL.B. degree from the same university in 1967. In 1985, Khan visited the United States to study the American legal system. In 1999 he attended a three-month training course in Tokyo, "Corruption Among Public Officials". In June 2004, Khan visited Ipoh and Kuala Lumpur, Malaysia in connection with an international seminar on "Human Rights and Independence on the Judiciary in the Islamic and Non-Islamic Judicial Systems". In 2006 he visited Dhaka, Bangladesh for a conference on the criminal judicial system.

Professional career
Raza joined PCS (Judicial Branch) in 1970 after passing a competitive examination held in 1968–69, and was appointed Senior Civil Judge in 1973. In 1976 he was appointed an Additional District and Sessions Judge, and District and Sessions Judge in 1979. Khan was Judicial Commissioner for Northern Areas for over four years, and was appointed Special Judge Customs Taxation and Anti Smuggling in 1992–93. He was named to the Peshawar High Court on 14 December 1993, and confirmed in June 1995.

On 28 April 2000, Raza took the oath of office as Chief Justice of the Peshawar High Court. He was named to the Supreme Court of Pakistan, and took the oath of office on 10 January 2002. After refusing to take an oath on a Provisional Constitutional Order on 3 November 2007, he and eleven other judges were removed from the Supreme Court. On 19 September 2008, after a democratically elected government came to power, Khan was reinstated to the court with his seniority intact.

Major cases
On 28 September 2007, a nine-member Supreme Court of Pakistan bench, in a split 6–3 verdict, held that a petition challenging Pervez Musharraf's candidacy for a second term as president was invalid. Raza, head of bench Rana Bhagwandas and Mian Shakirullah Jan dissented with the majority opinion. Declaring the petition invalid were Javed Iqbal, Abdul Hameed Dogar, M. Javed Buttar, Mohammad Nawaz Abbasi, Faqir Muhammad Khokhar and Falak Sher.

He singularly dissented in a 13 to 1 verdict of the Supreme Court, holding that judges of the superior judiciary should not be condemned unheard; that they should not be proceeded against for contempt; that such notices issued be withdrawn.

In another case, in his separate note, he held that all beneficiaries of NRO be dealt with equality and without discrimination; that the monitoring cell constituted within the supreme court is unprecedented, and the court should take action only when violation of its order is complained by any aggrieved party.

References
https://www.facebook.com/JusticeSardarRaza

1945 births
Living people
Chief Election Commissioners of Pakistan
Forman Christian College alumni
Hindkowan people
Pakistani judges
People from Abbottabad
University of the Punjab alumni
Chief Justices of the Peshawar High Court
Justices of the Supreme Court of Pakistan